William Alexander Lester III (born February 6, 1961) is an American semi-retired professional racing driver. He last competed part-time in the NASCAR Camping World Truck Series, driving the No. 17 Ford F-150 for David Gilliland Racing. Lester previously competed full-time in the Truck Series from 2002 to midway through 2007. Lester was the NASCAR's only full-time African-American driver during that time. After that, he moved to sports car racing, competing in the Rolex Sports Car Series from 2007 to 2012. Lester had also competed part-time in the same series from 1998 to 2001.

He also made two NASCAR Cup Series starts in 2006 and one Busch Series (now Xfinity) start in 1999.

Since his retirement from driving, Lester has worked as a member of the NASCAR National Motorsports Appeals Panel.

Racing career

Early career
He began racing in the road course circuits, running in the SCCA and IMSA series. He made his IMSA debut in 1989 at Sears Point International Raceway, qualifying ninth and finishing 12th in a Chevrolet Camaro. He also picked up a victory that year in an endurance race at Sears Point. In 1990, he began running the SCCA, running an unsponsored Oldsmobile Cutlass for Rocketsports at Portland, and one race for Tom Gloy at Mid-Ohio. He did not race professionally again until 1996, running SCCA events at Watkins Glen, Elkhart Lake, Wisconsin, Sears Point, and Reno, Nevada. He competed in the 24 Hours of Daytona in 1998 and 1999, finishing fifth and tenth, respectively.

NASCAR
In 1999, he became the first African-American to run a Busch Series race, when he ran at Watkins Glen in the No. 8 Dura Lube Chevrolet Monte Carlo owned by Bobby Hillin Jr. He started 24th and ran near a top-ten most of the day before an accident relegated him back to 21st. The next season, he made his Craftsman Truck debut at Portland, starting 31st and finishing 24th in the No. 23 Red Line Oil truck owned by Team 23 Racing. He also competed against Bobby Norfleet in that race, marking the only time in NASCAR two African-Americans have competed in the same race. He ran five races the next season in the No. 4 for Bobby Hamilton Racing, his best finish an eighteenth at Phoenix International Raceway.

In 2002, he ran in the Craftsman Truck series full-time for Hamilton. While he did not finish in the top-ten, he had sixteen finishes between 11th-18th, leading to a seventeenth-place points finish and runner-up to Brendan Gaughan for NASCAR Craftsman Truck Series Rookie of the Year. The next season, he grabbed his first career pole at Lowe's Motor Speedway and had a tenth-place run at Kansas Speedway, garnering a 14th-place finish in the championship standings.

He switched over to Bill Davis Racing in 2004. He had a best finish of tenth and finished 22nd in points. In 2005, he won two consecutive poles, and had his first top-five finishes. Lester raced in his first Nextel Cup race in the Golden Corral 500 at Atlanta Motor Speedway, driving the No. 23 Waste Management Dodge Charger for Davis in 2006. The race was supposed to be run on March 19, but was postponed for a day due to rain. He qualified 19th, becoming the first African-American to make a Cup race since 1986, and the sixth in series history. He finished 38th, six laps down. He ran  another race that season at Michigan, finishing 32nd. He later DNQed at California after spinning in qualifying.

After failing to finish in the top-ten in 2006, Lester departed Davis to drive the No. 15 Billy Ballew Motorsports Chevy. His best finish was an eighth at Kentucky, when he stepped out of the truck due to sponsor problems. After he was unable to find another ride in NASCAR, he left in 2008 to return to sports car racing.

On February 26, 2021, Lester announced on NASCAR Race Hub that he would be coming out of retirement to compete in the Truck Series race at his home track of Atlanta, which was also the same track where he made his Cup Series debut at in 2006. The team was revealed as David Gilliland Racing on March 12, with local Ford dealerships and Camping World as his sponsors. He finished 36th.

Return to sports cars

In 2008, Lester drove the No. 3 Riley Daytona Prototype for Southard Motorsports in the Grand-Am Rolex Sports Car Series, partnering with Shane Lewis. He moved to Orbit Racing for 2009, finishing 3rd at the summer Daytona race. The next year, Lester moved to a new team in Starworks Motorsport driving the No. 7 BMW Riley for the full season, finishing 17th in points.

For 2011, Lester moved to the GT category with Autohaus Motorsports and their Chevrolet Camaro team. On May 14, 2011, Lester made sports car history by becoming the first African-American driver to win in any Grand-Am division. Fittingly, Lester won at the Virginia International Raceway, located close to the home of NASCAR's first African-American winner, Wendell Scott.

Personal life
In 1984, he earned a Bachelor of Science degree in EECS from the University of California, Berkeley. Fresh out of college, he worked at Hewlett-Packard for 15 years before deciding to focus full-time on auto racing.

Lester lives in Windermere, Florida with his wife Cheryl, and their sons William Alexander IV (Alex) and Austin Richard.

He published an autobiography, Winning in Reverse, in February 2021.

Motorsports career results

NASCAR
(key) (Bold – Pole position awarded by qualifying time. Italics – Pole position earned by points standings or practice time. * – Most laps led.)

Nextel Cup Series

Busch Series

Camping World Truck Series

 Season still in progress
 Ineligible for series points

References

External links

 
 

Living people
1961 births
Racing drivers from Washington, D.C.
24 Hours of Daytona drivers
Rolex Sports Car Series drivers
NASCAR drivers
Trans-Am Series drivers
UC Berkeley College of Engineering alumni
African-American racing drivers
21st-century African-American people
20th-century African-American sportspeople
Starworks Motorsport drivers